The 1971 Lamar Cardinals football team represented Lamar University as a member of the Southland Conference during the 1971 NCAA College Division football season. Led by ninth-year head coach Vernon Glass, the Cardinals compiled an overall record of 5–6 with a mark of 4–1 in conference play, sharing the Southland title with new conference member, Louisiana Tech, and the departing . Lamar played home games at Cardinal Stadium in Beaumont, Texas. 

The 1971 season marked the first year the Cardinals competed as the Lamar University Cardinals following the school's name change from Lamar State College of Technology to Lamar University on August 23, 1971.

Schedule

References

Lamar
Lamar Cardinals football seasons
Southland Conference football champion seasons
Lamar Cardinals football